Miroslav Radulovič (born 6 September 1984) is a Slovenian football defender.

References

External links
PrvaLiga profile 

1984 births
Living people
Sportspeople from Novo Mesto
Slovenian footballers
Association football defenders
NK IB 1975 Ljubljana players
FC Koper players
Slovenian PrvaLiga players
NK Celje players
Slovenian expatriate footballers
Expatriate footballers in Norway